The 139th General Assembly of the U.S. state of Georgia convened its first session on January 12, 1987, at the Georgia State Capitol in Atlanta.  The 139th Georgia General Assembly succeeded the 138th and served as the precedent for the 140th General Assembly in 1989.

Party standings

Senate

House of Representatives 

*Active political parties in Georgia are not limited to the Democratic and Republican parties.  Libertarians, and occasionally others, run candidates in elections.  However, for the 1987-88 session of the General Assembly, only the two major parties were successful in electing legislators to office.

Officers

Senate

Presiding Officer

Majority leadership

Minority leadership

House of Representatives

Presiding Officer

Majority leadership

Minority leadership

Members of the State Senate

Members of the House of Representatives

External links

Georgia General Assembly website 
Official Georgia Government Publications - Library - Link to "Picture Book"

Georgia (U.S. state) legislative sessions
1987 in American politics
1988 in American politics
1987 in Georgia (U.S. state)
1988 in Georgia (U.S. state)